Passion of Love is a 1981 Italian drama film directed by Ettore Scola and was adapted from the 1869 novel Fosca by Iginio Ugo Tarchetti. The film was entered into the 1981 Cannes Film Festival and served as the inspiration for the 1994 Broadway musical Passion by Stephen Sondheim and James Lapine.

Plot
In Turin in the winter of 1862, the unmarried Giorgio Bacchetti, a good-looking cavalry captain with a distinguished combat record, is involved in a passionate affair with Clara, a sweet and beautiful married woman. Their meetings end when he is transferred to an isolated outpost on the frontier.

The officers there eat and socialise in the house of their colonel, who has given a home to a handicapped cousin of his. This is a young woman named Fosca, suffering not only from a range of physical and psychological problems but also strikingly ugly. Yet she is also sensitive and cultured, and desperate for sympathetic male company. Encouraged by the regimental surgeon, who thinks contact with the new arrival may help, Giorgio spends time with her.

While she thrives on what to her is a conquest, Giorgio is dragged down by the emotional strain of her demands on him and falls ill. The surgeon realises that his plan was a mistake and that the only solution is to get Giorgio a transfer. The transfer notice is delivered during the Christmas party in the colonel's house. Fosca goes into massive hysterics, to the horror of the guests who had no idea of the existence and depth of her passion.

The colonel, considering his honour impugned by this relationship, which Giorgio entered into out of kindness and pity, challenges Giorgio to a duel next morning. That night, knowing it may be his last and desperately sorry for Fosca, he goes to her bedroom and they consummate their strange love. In the duel, he wounds the colonel but himself collapses under the nervous strain. Fosca dies of shock, and Giorgio is invalided out of the army with no prospects.

Cast
 Bernard Giraudeau as Giorgio
 Valeria D'Obici as Fosca
 Laura Antonelli as Clara
 Jean-Louis Trintignant as Doctor
 Massimo Girotti as Colonel
 Bernard Blier as Maj. Tarasso
 Gerardo Amato as Lt. Baggi
 Sandro Ghiani as Giorgio's attendant
 Alberto Incrocci as Capt. Rivolti
 Rosaria Schemmari as Fosca's maid
 Francesco Piastra as Colonel's attendant
 Saverio Vallone as Blond lieutenant
 Franco Committeri as Clara's husband

References

External links
 
 

1981 films
1981 drama films
Italian drama films
1980s Italian-language films
Films directed by Ettore Scola
Films set in the 1860s
Films based on Italian novels
Films with screenplays by Ruggero Maccari
Films scored by Armando Trovajoli
Films with screenplays by Ettore Scola
1980s Italian films